Roy Miller Hernández (born November 24, 1984) is a Costa Rican professional footballer who plays as a defender for Sporting San José.

Career

Club
Miller began his career in the youth ranks of Cartaginés. In 2002, he went on trial with Argentine side Olimpo de Bahía Blanca, but was unable to acclimate himself to the club and returned to Costa Rica.

Miller turned professional with Cartaginés before moving to the north of Norway at Bodø/Glimt along with his compatriot and teammate at Cartaginés, Randall Brenes. He had a successful stay at Bodø/Glimt, appearing in 52 league matches and scoring 6 goals, leading to interest from top Norwegian side Rosenborg.

In February 2008 Miller signed a 3-year long contract with Rosenborg, and quickly established himself as the team's starting left back. A knee injury curtailed his progress with Rosenborg, and upon returning to action, he was loaned out to Örgryte on 28 July 2009. With Örgryte Miller played in the final 14 games of the 2009 Allsvenskan season. Miller was very appreciated by the Örgryte fans.

In January 2010, Miller signed a 2-year long contract with New York Red Bulls of Major League Soccer. On 20 March 2010, Miller started for Red Bulls in a 3–1 victory against Santos FC, which was the first match played at the new Red Bull Arena. Miller made his Major League Soccer debut on 27 March 2010, playing the full 90 in New York's opening game of the 2010 MLS season against Chicago Fire that ended in a 1–0 victory for New York. On October 21, 2010 Miller started for Red Bulls in a 2–0 victory over New England Revolution which  clinched the regular season Eastern Conference title.

In December 2013 it was reported that Miller would be returning to Costa Rica to sign with top club Saprissa, however, Miller rejected the clubs offer and decided to renew his contract with New York. Miller was limited to 17 league games during the 2013 season due to injuries and national team duty, however he was a part of the team that captured the club's first official title the MLS Supporters' Shield. In 2015, Miller was slowly phased out of the starting eleven due to the emergence of Jamaican leftback, Kemar Lawrence and missed a large portion of the season due to injuries as well. Miller won his second trophy with the club when they claimed the Supporter's Shield for the second time in three years. On November 30, 2015, the day after the Red Bulls were eliminated from the playoffs, it was reported that the club would not pick up Miller's option, ending his six-year tenure with the club.

On December 28, 2015, Miller signed with Costa Rican club Saprissa. In his first season at the club Miller appeared in 22 league matches and scored one goal. In his second season with the club he appeared in 26 matches scoring three goals, and helped Saprissa to the 2016 Torneo Invierno title.

On December 10, 2018, Miller was released by Portland Timbers after two seasons with the club.

International
Miller was an unmovable player at youth levels with the Ticos. He played in the 2001 FIFA U-17 World Championship held in Trinidad and Tobago and the qualification rounds for the 2006 FIFA World Cup, he was left out of the squad just a few weeks before the inaugural game's kick off.

Miller made his full debut for the Ticos in 2005 as a substitute against Ecuador, and has since then collected 52 more caps including two in the 2010 World Cup qualification playoffs against Uruguay and one in the 2014 FIFA World Cup.

International goals
Scores and results list. Costa Rica's goal tally first.

Honors
Rosenborg BK
 Tippeligaen: 2009

New York Red Bulls
 MLS Supporters' Shield: 2013, 2015

Costa Rica
 Copa Centroamericana: 2005, 2014

Statistics

References

External links
 
 
 (Rosenborg BK profile)
 rbk.no/ 
 proplayermanagement.com

1984 births
Living people
Footballers from San José, Costa Rica
Association football defenders
Costa Rica international footballers
Costa Rican footballers
C.S. Cartaginés players
FK Bodø/Glimt players
Rosenborg BK players
Örgryte IS players
New York Red Bulls players
New York Red Bulls II players
Deportivo Saprissa players
Portland Timbers players
Portland Timbers 2 players
2005 UNCAF Nations Cup players
2005 CONCACAF Gold Cup players
2011 Copa Centroamericana players
2013 CONCACAF Gold Cup players
2014 FIFA World Cup players
2014 Copa Centroamericana players
2015 CONCACAF Gold Cup players
Eliteserien players
Norwegian First Division players
Allsvenskan players
Major League Soccer players
Liga FPD players
USL Championship players
Costa Rican expatriate footballers
Expatriate footballers in Norway
Expatriate footballers in Sweden
Expatriate soccer players in the United States
Costa Rican expatriate sportspeople in Norway
Costa Rican expatriate sportspeople in Sweden
Costa Rican expatriate sportspeople in the United States
Copa Centroamericana-winning players